The 2018 New Zealand Radio Awards were the awards for excellence in the New Zealand radio industry during 2017. It was the 41st New Zealand Radio Awards, recognising staff, volunteers and contractors in both commercial and non-commercial broadcasting.

Winners and nominees

This is a list of nominees, with winners in bold.

Best Community Access Programmes

Best Content

Best New Broadcaster

Best News & Sport

Best On Air

Best Promotion

Best Radio Creative

Best Spoken Programmes

Best Technical Production

Station of the Year

Other

References

New Zealand Radio Awards